The Afterparty is the third and final album by Eurodance group Captain Hollywood Project, released on 18 November 1996 by Mighty. This album was recorded under the name "Captain Hollywood". The record includes three singles: "Over & Over", "Love and Pain", and "The Afterparty". "Over and Over" was a hit in Europe, peaking at No. 35 in Austria and No. 45 in Germany.

Track listing
"Intro" – 1:32   
"Far Away" – 4:59   
"Over & Over" – 3:43   
"A Little Bit" – 4:21   
"Waiting So Long" – 4:13   
"Love and Pain" – 4:19   
"All The Tears" – 4:49   
"I Can't Stand It" – 3:37   
"Up 'N' Down" – 4:20   
"Afterparty" – 3:38   
"Tell Me That I'm Dreaming" – 3:52

Credits
Producers – Alex Reginald Belcher and Tony Dawson-Harrison (tracks: 1 2 5, 7 to 11); Miles Gordon and P Force (tracks 3, 4, 6) 
Engineer – Alex Belcher 
Mastered by Peter Harenberg, Frank Petersen, Nico Mass 
Mixed by Alex Reginald Belcher, Tony Dawson-Harrison

Design – M. Kowalkowski
Photography by Helge Strauss

References

1996 albums
Captain Hollywood Project albums